Kari Arkivuo (born 23 June 1983) is a Finnish former professional football defender who could play as left back and right back. Arkivuo was born in Lahti, Finland where he played for the local teams before moving to Sandefjord at age 22 in 2006.

Arkivuo made his international debut for Finland in November 2005, at the age of 22.

Club career

FC Lahti
A product of his local FC Kuusysi, Arkivuo made his senior debut for FC Lahti on 3 May 2001 against Inter. He was able to appear in four league matches during his debut season, scoring once in the process. Arkivuo went on to make total of 101 league appearances and 12 goals for Lahti during his five-year stay.

Sandefjord
On 2006 he signed a three-year contract with Sandefjord in the Norwegian Premier League. He started his first season well, but suffered an injury in May and had to join Sandefjord's reserve team in order to gain play time. After season 2007 Sandefjord was relegated to Adeccoligaen. After just one season in the second tier Sandefjord returned to Tippeligaen.

Go Ahead Eagles
After struggling with injuries and facing a relegation with Sandefjord, Arkivuo left the club and joined the Eerste Divisie side Go Ahead Eagles in 2009.

Häcken
During the summer 2010 it was announced that Arkivuo had signed a 1+3 year-contract with Allsvenskan side BK Häcken.

FC Lahti
In October 2019 it was announced that Arkivuo would be returning to play for FC Lahti in Veikkausliiga.

International career
After playing 15 times for the Finland U21, Arkivuo made his national team debut on 12 November 2005 in a friendly match against Estonia and went on scoring in the 2−2 home draw. After appearing mostly in friendlies, Arkivuo was called up by national coach Mixu Paatelainen for the Euro 2012 qualifying matches, where he has been playing as a right back. After the UEFA Euro 2012 qualifications he established himself as a regular in the national team and has appeared in every qualification campaign since.

Personal life
He is commonly known by the nickname Arkikari amongst the supporters of Finland national team.

Career statistics

Club

International goals

International

Honours and achievements

Country
Finland national football team
2012 Baltic Cup Runner-up

Club
Häcken
Svenska Cupen: 2016

References

External links

 
 
 
 
 

1983 births
Living people
Sportspeople from Lahti
Finnish footballers
FC Lahti players
Sandefjord Fotball players
Go Ahead Eagles players
BK Häcken players
Veikkausliiga players
Eliteserien players
Norwegian First Division players
Eerste Divisie players
Allsvenskan players
Finland international footballers
Finland under-21 international footballers
Finnish expatriate footballers
Expatriate footballers in Norway
Finnish expatriate sportspeople in Norway
Expatriate footballers in the Netherlands
Finnish expatriate sportspeople in the Netherlands
Expatriate footballers in Sweden
Finnish expatriate sportspeople in Sweden
Association football fullbacks